Iván Ulises Sepúlveda González (born 1 September 1978) is a Chilean former footballer who played as a defender for clubs in Chile and Colombia.

Career
A product of O'Higgins youth system, Sepúlveda made his debut in the 1998 season, when the club got promotion to the 1999 Primera División de Chile, alongside players such as Mauricio Dinamarca, Roberto González, Alejandro Tobar, Mario Núñez, among others. 

In Chilean Primera División, he also played for Santiago Wanderers, Deportes Puerto Montt, Deportes Melipilla and Curicó Unido.

In the second level, he also played for Curicó Unido, with whom he won the league title in 2008, and Lota Schwager.

Abroad, he had a stint with Colombian side Centauros Villavicencio in 2003.

Honours
Curicó Unido
 Primera B de Chile: 2008

References

External links
 
 
 Iván Sepúlveda at PlaymakerStats.com

1978 births
Living people
People from Rancagua
Chilean footballers
Chilean expatriate footballers
Chilean Primera División players
Primera B de Chile players
O'Higgins F.C. footballers
Santiago Wanderers footballers
Puerto Montt footballers
Deportes Melipilla footballers
Curicó Unido footballers
Lota Schwager footballers
Categoría Primera A players
Centauros Villavicencio footballers
Chilean expatriate sportspeople in Colombia
Expatriate footballers in Colombia
Association football defenders